Megan Blunk (born September 12, 1989) is an American wheelchair basketball player for the United States women's national wheelchair basketball team. She won a gold medal for Team USA during the 2016 Summer Paralympics.

Early life
Blunk was born September 12, 1989, in Tacoma, Washington to parents Wendy Ricketts and David Blunk. After graduating from Peninsula High School in 2008, Blunk became paralyzed from the waist down due a motorcycle crash. Following this, two of her friends committed suicide, which increased her depression. Despite this, Blunk accepted a placement at the University of Illinois at Urbana Champaign's women's wheelchair basketball team. It was during summer break from the University of Illinois that Blunk began para-canoeing at the Gig Harbor Canoe and Kayak Club.

Career
In 2013, she competed with Team USA at the ParaCanoe World Championships, where she won two silver medals  However, after qualifying for the final roster with the 2015 United States women's national wheelchair basketball team, she competed in the 2015 Parapan American Games, and later tried out for the United States para-canoe trials. With Team USA, Blunk helped take home a gold medal under coach Stephanie Wheeler.

Deciding to stick with basketball, Blunk helped Team USA win a gold medal at the 2016 Summer Paralympics by beating Germany 62–45 in the medal finals. In 2018, Blunk participated in former National Football League player Colin Kaepernick's viral Nike commercial.

References

External links 
 Team USA profile

Living people
Basketball players from Tacoma, Washington
1989 births
American women's wheelchair basketball players
Paralympic gold medalists for the United States
Medalists at the 2016 Summer Paralympics
American disabled sportspeople
University of Illinois Urbana-Champaign alumni
Paralympic medalists in wheelchair basketball
Wheelchair basketball players at the 2016 Summer Paralympics
Paralympic wheelchair basketball players of the United States
People with paraplegia
20th-century American women
21st-century American women